An attap dwelling is traditional housing found in the kampongs of Brunei, Indonesia, Malaysia and Singapore. Named after the attap palm, which provides the wattle for the walls, and the leaves with which their roofs are thatched, these dwellings can range from huts to substantial houses. Until the nineteenth century even significant public buildings such as temples were built in this manner. The attap dwelling was used as the inspiration for the natural cross ventilation system for Newton Suites, by WOHA Architects, Singapore.

References

Sources 
 Normand-Prunieres, Helene. 'Malaysian Dwellings', Proceedings of ENHR International Housing Conference 2004, (Cambridge: University, 2004)

House types
Architecture in Indonesia
Architecture in Malaysia
Architecture in Singapore